Artur Lenartowski (born 17 March 1988 in Częstochowa) is a Polish footballer who plays for Raków Częstochowa II as a midfielder.

External links
 
 Artur Lenartowski at Footballdatabase
 

1988 births
Living people
Sportspeople from Częstochowa
Association football midfielders
Polish footballers
Raków Częstochowa players
Piast Gliwice players
Korona Kielce players
Podbeskidzie Bielsko-Biała players
Ruch Chorzów players
GKS Bełchatów players
Elana Toruń players
Siarka Tarnobrzeg players
Ekstraklasa players
II liga players
III liga players